The 2022 World Mixed Doubles (officially the 2022 BetVictor World Mixed Doubles) was a non-ranking professional snooker team tournament that took place from 24 to 25 September 2022 at the Marshall Arena in Milton Keynes. Organised by the World Snooker Tour and sponsored by bookmaker BetVictor, the event was televised by ITV. It was the first staging of the tournament since 1991, when Steve Davis and Allison Fisher defeated Stephen Hendry and Stacey Hillyard 5–4 in the final in Hamburg. It featured a total prize fund of £140,000, of which the winners received £60,000 (£30,000 per player).

The event featured the top four men from the snooker world rankings and the top four women from the World Women's Snooker rankings. The teams were selected via a draw that took place on 6 August 2022. Ronnie O'Sullivan was paired with Reanne Evans, Judd Trump with Ng On-yee, Mark Selby with Rebecca Kenna, and Neil Robertson with Mink Nutcharut. The tournament was played as a round-robin with four- matches, followed by a final between the top-two placed teams. The team members made alternate visits to the table rather than playing alternate shots.

Despite losing their first two round-robin matches, Robertson and Mink defeated Trump and On-yee 4–0 in their last round-robin match to reach the final, where they defeated Selby and Kenna 4–2 to win the tournament. Selby made the event's highest break of 134.

Format
The World Mixed Doubles was played for the first time since 1991 in 2022. In 1991, the event was played in Hamburg, Germany, and was won by Steve Davis and Allison Fisher, who defeated Stephen Hendry and Stacey Hillyard 5–4 in the final. The 2022 edition was played with four teams made up of the top four ranked players from the World Snooker Tour and the World Women's Snooker Tour. The event took place on 24 and 25 September 2022 at the Marshall Arena in Milton Keynes. Sponsored by bookmaker BetVictor, the event was televised by ITV. The four teams competed in a round-robin tournament with matches played as the best-of-four . The two teams that won the most frames over the round-robin progressed to the final, contested over the best-of-seven frames.

The teams were selected via a draw that took place on 6 August 2022. The 2022 World Snooker Championship winner Ronnie O'Sullivan was paired with 12-time Women's World Snooker Championship winner Reanne Evans, 2019 World Snooker Championship winner Judd Trump with Ng On-yee, Mark Selby with Rebecca Kenna, and Neil Robertson with reigning women's world champion Mink Nutcharut.

Prize Fund
A breakdown of the prize money awarded for the event is shown below:
 Winners: £60,000 – (£30,000 per player)
 Runners-up: £40,000 – (£20,000 per player)
 Third in group: £20,000 – (£10,000 per player) 
 Fourth in group: £20,000 – (£10,000 per player)
 Total: £140,000

Tournament Summary
All matches in the round-robin phase were a best-of-four, with the first two matches played on 24 September. They also won the third frame, with On-Yee making a  before Evans made a break of 62 in the final frame. Speaking after the 3–1 win, On-Yee commented that her clearance in frame three had "huge pressure but luckily I handled it well". In the opening frame of the next match, Selby made the highest break of the event, a 134 against Robertson and Mink. Robertson made 64 in the next frame, but only won one frame as Selby made breaks of 40 and 64 to win 3–1.

The final was played over the best of seven frames on the evening of 25 September. Robertson and Mink defeated Selby and Kenna 4–2.

Draw

Round Robin 
The results from the round-robin is shown below. Teams in bold denote match winners.

Final

Century breaks
There were three century breaks made during the event. The highest was a 134 made by Selby in the first frame of their group stage match against Robertson and Mink.
 134, 107 – Mark Selby
 111 – Ronnie O'Sullivan

References

World Mixed Doubles
World Mixed Doubles
Sport in Milton Keynes
Mixed doubles
World Mixed Doubles